Shir Darreh (also Romanized as Shīr Darreh) is a village in Valupey Rural District, in the Central District of Savadkuh County, Mazandaran Province, Iran. At the 2006 census, its population was 59, in 24 families.

References 

Populated places in Savadkuh County